A dresser is a theatrical stagehand who is involved with maintaining costume quality at each performance. They are hired by either the director, producer, or wardrobe supervisor. They report directly to the wardrobe supervisor and are usually paid by the hour.

See also 

 List of theatre personnel
 The Dresser, a 1980 play about a dresser, afterwards adapted for the cinema (1983) and television (2015)
 Hamlet's Dresser, a 2002 memoir by a dresser

Stage crew
Theatrical occupations